Shock Waves is a Hardy Boys and Nancy Drew Supermystery crossover novel.

Nancy and Ned go to Padre Island, located on the Gulf Coast, to spend spring break with each other in style. Frank and Joe are on Padre Island too, staying in the home of their millionaire friend, Buck Calhoun. Calhoun then finds a dead body in the middle of a shipwreck, and the Hardys team up with Nancy to solve the case, which also involves a crime syndicate, a vengeful heart, a mix of emotions, and lost treasures.

References

Supermystery
1989 American novels
1989 children's books
Novels set on islands
Novels set in Texas